Ballyhahill ( or Baile Uí Sháithil) is a village and townland in County Limerick, Ireland. As of the 2016 census, the village had a population of 146 people. The White River flows to the east of the village.

Name
According to the Placenames Database of Ireland, two Irish language derivations of the village name are proposed: Baile Dhá Thuile ("town of two floods") or Baile Uí Sháithil ("town of Ó Sáithil"). The former (Baile Dhá Thuile) has official recognition and appears on road signage around Ballyhahill.

History
Evidence of ancient settlement in the area includes a number of ringfort sites in the townland of Ballyhahill and the neighbouring townlands of Mohernagh and Finnoo. A Carnegie library was built in Ballyhahill . The local national (primary) school, Scoil Naomh Mhuire, was built in 1959. As of 2017, the school had 39 pupils enrolled.

References

Towns and villages in County Limerick